Nelson Castro (born January 25, 1972) is an American politician from the state of New York. A Democrat, he was first elected to the New York State Assembly in District 86 in 2008. Castro resigned from office in 2013 after pleading guilty to perjury charges. He is notable for having worn a wire as an FBI informant while serving in elected office; in so doing, he assisted the federal government in prosecuting other corrupt elected officials.

Political career

In 2008, Castro was first elected to the New York State Assembly in District 86; the district includes the University Heights, Tremont, and Fordham sections of the Bronx.  He succeeded Luis Diaz and became the first Dominican to represent the Bronx in the State Assembly. In July 2009, the Bronx County District Attorney charged Castro with perjury. The charges were kept secret, and Castro agreed to cooperate with the Bronx County District Attorney and later with the FBI. Castro proceeded to win re-election in 2010 and 2012, but was living a "double life" as an FBI informant during that time. Information obtained by Castro was used to prosecute six other corrupt elected officials. While Castro's original deal did not involve jail time, he was charged in 2013 with lying to investigators. In 2013, Castro's role as an FBI informant became public knowledge during the scandal affecting his Assembly colleague, Eric Stevenson. Castro resigned his Assembly seat on April 8, 2013. He later pleaded guilty to the 2009 state charges and the 2013 federal charge against him. In September 2014, Castro received a sentence of two years' probation and 500 hours of community service for his federal crimes. On November 17, 2014, Castro was given a three-year conditional discharge for his state crimes.

References

1972 births
Living people
American politicians of Dominican Republic descent
American Seventh-day Adventists
Democratic Party members of the New York State Assembly
Politicians from the Bronx
New York (state) politicians convicted of corruption
New York (state) politicians convicted of crimes
21st-century American politicians
Hispanic and Latino American state legislators in New York (state)